Edaphodon hesperis was a prehistoric chimaeriform fish species belonging to the genus Edaphodon, of which all the species are now extinct.  Edaphodon hesperis was a type of rabbitfish, a cartilaginous fish related to sharks and rays, and indeed, some rabbitfishes are still alive today.

Callorhinchidae